This list of mathematical series contains formulae for finite and infinite sums. It can be used in conjunction with other tools for evaluating sums.
Here,  is taken to have the value 
 denotes the fractional part of 
 is a Bernoulli polynomial.
 is a Bernoulli number, and here, 
 is an Euler number.
 is the Riemann zeta function.
 is the gamma function.
 is a polygamma function.
 is a polylogarithm.
 is binomial coefficient
 denotes exponential of

Sums of powers
See Faulhaber's formula.

The first few values are:

See zeta constants.

The first few values are:
 (the Basel problem)

Power series

Low-order polylogarithms
Finite sums:
, (geometric series)

The following is a useful property to calculate low-integer-order polylogarithms recursively in closed form:

Exponential function

 (cf. mean of Poisson distribution)
 (cf. second moment of Poisson distribution)

where  is the Touchard polynomials.

Trigonometric, inverse trigonometric, hyperbolic, and inverse hyperbolic functions relationship

 (versine)
 (haversine)

Modified-factorial denominators

Binomial coefficients 
 (see )
 
 , generating function of the Catalan numbers
 , generating function of the Central binomial coefficients

Harmonic numbers
(See harmonic numbers, themselves defined )

Binomial coefficients 

 (see Multiset)
 (see Vandermonde identity)

Trigonometric functions 
Sums of sines and cosines arise in Fourier series.

,

Rational functions 

An infinite series of any rational function of  can be reduced to a finite series of polygamma functions, by use of partial fraction decomposition, as explained here. This fact can also be applied to finite series of rational functions, allowing the result to be computed in constant time even when the series contains a large number of terms.

Exponential function 

 (see the Landsberg–Schaar relation)

Numeric series  
These numeric series can be found by plugging in numbers from the series listed above.

Alternating harmonic series

Sum of reciprocal of factorials

Trigonometry and π

Reciprocal of triangular numbers

Where

Reciprocal of tetrahedral numbers  

Where

Exponential and logarithms

See also

 Series (mathematics)
 List of integrals
 
 Taylor series
 Binomial theorem
 Gregory's series
 On-Line Encyclopedia of Integer Sequences

Notes

References
Many books with a list of integrals also have a list of series.

 
Series
Series